The 1990 edition of the Campeonato Carioca kicked off on January 27, 1990 and ended on July 29, 1990. It is the official tournament organized by FFERJ (Federação de Futebol do Estado do Rio de Janeiro, or Rio de Janeiro State Football Federation. Only clubs based in the Rio de Janeiro State are allowed to play. Twelve teams contested this edition. Botafogo won the title for the 16th time. no teams were relegated.

System
The tournament would be divided in three stages:
 Taça Guanabara: The twelve teams all played in a single round-robin format against each other. The champions qualified to the Final phase. 
 Taça Rio: The twelve teams all played in a single round-robin format against each other. The champions qualified to the Final phase.
 Final phase: In the Semifinals, the champions of Taça Guanabara and Taça Rio would play in a single match. the winner would face the team with the best season record in the Finals, also played in a single match.

Championship

Copa Guanabara

Copa Rio

Aggregate table

Final phase

Semifinals

Finals

References

Campeonato Carioca seasons
Carioca